Tumul is a rural locality (a selo) in Kyupsky Rural Okrug of Ust-Maysky District in the Sakha Republic, Russia, located  from Ust-Maya, the administrative center of the district, and  from Kyuptsy, the administrative center of the rural okrug. Its population as of the 2002 Census was 74.

References

Notes

Sources
Official website of the Sakha Republic. Registry of the Administrative-Territorial Divisions of the Sakha Republic. Ust-Maysky District. 

Rural localities in Ust-Maysky District